Kenneth Hunnel Weekes (24 January 1912 – 9 February 1998) was a West Indian international cricketer who represented Jamaica (1938–1947/48) and played two Test matches on the West Indies tour of England in 1939.

Cousin of the renowned batsman Everton, he was the first Test cricketer to be born in the United States; as of 2007, the only other US-born cricketer to have played at that level is the Sri Lankan Jehan Mubarak.

See also
 List of Test cricketers born in non-Test playing nations

1912 births
1998 deaths
West Indies Test cricketers
American cricketers
Jamaican cricketers
Jamaica cricketers
Sportspeople from Boston
Cricket in Massachusetts